Moshe Yehoshua Yehuda Leib Diskin (1818–1898), also known as the Maharil Diskin, was a leading rabbi, Talmudist, and Biblical commentator. He served as a rabbi in Łomża, Mezritch, Kovno, Shklov, Brisk, and, finally, Jerusalem, after moving to Eretz Yisrael in 1878. He opened what today is known as the Diskin Orphan Home in 1881.

Biography
Rabbi Yehoshua Leib Diskin was born on December 8, 1818, in Grodno, then part of the Russian Empire. His father, Binyamin Diskin, was rabbi of that city, then Volkovisk, and later Łomża.

He married Hinda Rachel, daughter of Rabbi Broder, and lived with his father-in-law in Wolkowitz. He received rabbinic ordination at the age of 18, and inherited his father's rabbinate of Łomża at the age of 25.

Rabbi Diskin's second wife, Sarah, was known as the "Brisker Rebbetzin". She had a very strong mind, and came from a prestigious family descended from Rabbi Yechezkel Landau (the Nodah bi-Yehudah) and Joshua Zeitlin. She died in 1907. Rabbi Yehoshua Leib Diskin had a brother, Avraham Shmuel, born 1827 in Łomża, later a rabbi. The brother pre-deceased his older brother.

Rabbinic career
In 1878, Rabbi Yehoshua Leib Diskin left his rabbinical position in Brest-Litovsk and moved to Palestine, where he became recognized as a leading rabbinic figure in the Ashkenazi community of Jerusalem. In the 1880s, Rabbi Diskin was offered the position of Chief Rabbi of New York City, which he declined. Rabbi Diskin established a yeshiva by the name of Ohel Moshe (Tent of Moses). He held the line against attempts by maskilim to introduce secular institutions to Jerusalem. His son was Rabbi Yitzhak Yerucham Diskin.

Diskin Orphanage
The city's large religious community was then living under near impossible conditions. The persecution and disease from which the Jews of the Holy Land suffered moved Diskin to open a home for orphans in the Old City, after bringing needy children into his own home. The Diskin Orphanage (initially known as the Diskin Orphan Home) was formally established  in 1881. From the Jewish Quarter, it moved to Street of the Prophets outside the walls of the Old City. Rabbi Diskin's second wife, Sarah (Sonia Rotner), known as the Brisker Rebbetzin, brought 40,000 rubles into the marriage which was used for the support of this institution.

Death and legacy
Rabbi Diskin died on January 23, 1898 (29 Tevet 5658). He is buried on the Mount of Olives in Jerusalem, Israel.

Y.L. Diskin Street in Jerusalem is named after him.

References

External links
The official Diskin Orphanage website

1818 births
1898 deaths
Haredi rabbis in Europe
Lithuanian Haredi rabbis
Ashkenazi rabbis in Ottoman Palestine
Polish Haredi rabbis
Rabbis from Lomza
Rabbis in Jerusalem
People from Grodno
Burials at the Jewish cemetery on the Mount of Olives
Emigrants from the Russian Empire to the Ottoman Empire